Butcher is a common family name in England but it may have French origins. It was originally an occupational surname used to identify a person who worked as a butcher. The name derived from the Old English word boucher or the Old French word bouchier.

People with the surname Butcher

Arts and entertainment
A. J. Butcher, children's writer
Adam Butcher, Canadian film actor
Bilinda Butcher, vocalist and guitarist of rock band My Bloody Valentine
Clyde Butcher, American photographer
Fanny Butcher, American newspaper writer and literary critic
Goler T. Butcher, American lawyer and professor
Gordon Butcher, Australian member of The Warumpi Band
Jim Butcher, American fantasy writer
Jon Butcher, American singer, guitarist, and producer
Kristin Butcher, Canadian writer and reviewer
Lisa Butcher, English fashion model and TV presenter
Margaret Just Butcher (1913-2000), American educator, writer and civil rights activist
May Butcher, writer
Paige Butcher, Australian fashion model
Raegan Butcher, American poet and singer
Sam Butcher, American artist
Solomon Butcher, American photographer
Tim Butcher, English journalist and author
Tom Butcher, English television actor

In sports
Alan Butcher, English cricketer
Arthur Butcher, English cricketer
Basil Butcher, West Indian cricketer
Butcher (Surrey cricketer), 18th century English cricketer
David Butcher (cricketer), English cricketer
Don Butcher, English professional squash player
Donnie Butcher, American NBA basketball player and coach
Garth Butcher, Canadian NHL hockey player 
Gary Butcher, English cricketer
Harry Butcher (racing driver), American race car driver
Ian Butcher, English cricketer
Jason Butcher, American mixed martial artist
Mark Butcher, English cricketer
Max Butcher, American baseball pitcher
Mike Butcher, American baseball pitcher and coach
Necro Butcher, nickname of American professional wrestler Dylan Keith Summers
Richard Butcher, English footballer
Roland Butcher, cricketer
Rory Butcher, Scottish BTCC racing car driver
Susan Butcher, dog musher, multiple winner of the Iditarod Trail Sled Dog Race
Terry Butcher, English football manager
Wendell Butcher, American football player
Will Butcher, American NHL hockey player

Politicians and diplomats
David Butcher, New Zealand politician
Herbert Butcher, British politician and Member of Parliament
Jake Butcher, American banker and politician
Samuel Henry Butcher, classical scholar and Member of Parliament
William Butcher, Australian politician

Other
Harry C. Butcher, naval aide to General Dwight D. Eisenhower
John Butcher (disambiguation)
Marjorie V. Butcher, American mathematician
Paul Butcher (disambiguation)
Samuel Butcher (disambiguation)
Stephen Butcher (disambiguation)
Thomas W. Butcher,(1867–1947) American academic and university president
Willard C. Butcher, banker

Fictional individuals named Butcher

EastEnders
Several characters from the soap opera EastEnders have the surname Butcher.
 Bianca Butcher
 Clare Butcher
 Diane Butcher
 Frank Butcher
 Jacques Butcher
 Janine Butcher
 Liam Butcher
 Mo Butcher
 Morgan Butcher
 Pat Butcher
 Peggy Butcher
 Ricky Butcher
 Sam Butcher
 Tiffany Butcher

Ghosts 2019 TV Series
 Patrick (Pat) Butcher

The Boys
 Baby Butcher
 Ryan Butcher
 Becky Butcher
 Becca Butcher
 Billy Butcher
 Connie Butcher
 Lenny Butcher
 Sam Butcher

See also
 Butcher
 Butcher (disambiguation)

References

English-language surnames
Occupational surnames
English-language occupational surnames